Deer hunting is hunting for deer for meat and sport, an activity which dates back tens of thousands of years. Venison, the name for deer meat, is a nutritious and natural food source of animal protein that can be obtained through deer hunting. There are many different types of deer around the world that are hunted for their meat. For sport, often hunters try to kill deer with the largest and most antlers to score them using inches. There are two different categories of antlers. They are typical and nontypical. They measure tine length, beam length, and beam mass by each tine. They will add all these measurements up to get a score. This score is the score without deductions. Deductions occur when the opposite tine is not the same length as it is opposite. That score is the deducted score.

Hunting deer is a regulated activity in many territories. In the United States, a state government agency such as a Department of Fish and Wildlife (DFW) or Department of Natural Resources (DNR) oversees the regulations. In the United Kingdom, it is illegal to use bows or rifles chambered in bores smaller than .243 caliber (6mm) for hunting.

New Zealand 

New Zealand has had 10 species of deer (Cervidae) introduced. From the 1850s, red deer were liberated, followed by fallow, sambar, wapiti, sika, rusa, and whitetail. The introduced herds of axis and moose failed to grow, and have become extinct. In the absence of predators to control populations, deer were thought to be a pest due to their effect on native vegetation. From the 1950s, the government employed professional hunters to cull the deer population. Deer hunting is now a recreational activity, organised and advocated for at the national level by the New Zealand Deerstalkers' Association.

United States

United Kingdom and Republic of Ireland 

The term "deer hunting" is used in North America for the shooting of deer, but in the United Kingdom and Ireland, the term generally refers to the pursuit of deer with scent hounds, with unarmed followers typically on horseback.

There are six species of deer in the UK: red deer, roe deer, fallow deer, Sika deer, Reeves muntjac deer, and Chinese water deer, as well as hybrids of these deer. All are hunted to a degree reflecting their relative population either as sport or for culling. Closed seasons for deer vary by species. The practice of declaring a closed season in England dates back to medieval times, when it was called fence month and commonly lasted from June 9 to July 9, though the actual dates varied. It is illegal to use bows to hunt any wild animal in the UK under the Wildlife and Countryside Act 1981.

UK deer stalkers, if supplying venison (in fur) to game dealers, butchers and restaurants, need to hold a Lantra level 2 large game meat hygiene certificate. Courses are run by organisations such as the British Association for Shooting and Conservation and this qualification is also included within the Level 1 deer stalking certificate. If supplying venison for public consumption (meat), the provider must have a fully functioning and clean larder that meets FSA standards and must register as a food business with the local authority.

The vast majority of deer hunted in the UK are stalked. The phrase deer hunting is used to refer (in England and Wales) to the traditional practice of chasing deer with packs of hounds, currently illegal under the Hunting Act 2004.

In the late nineteenth and twentieth centuries, there were several packs of staghounds hunting "carted deer" in England and Ireland. Carted deer were red deer kept in captivity for the sole purpose of being hunted and recaptured alive. More recently, there were three packs of staghounds hunting wild red deer of both sexes on or around Exmoor and the New Forest Buckhounds hunting fallow deer bucks in the New Forest, the latter disbanding in 1997.

The practice of hunting with hounds, other than using two hounds to flush deer to be shot by waiting marksmen, has been banned in the UK since 2005; to date, two people have been convicted of breaking the law.

There is one pack of stag hounds in the Republic of Ireland and one in Northern Ireland, the former operating under a licence to hunt carted deer.

Australia
In Australia, there are six species of deer that are available to hunt. These are fallow deer, sambar, red deer, rusa, chital, and hog deer.

Gallery

See also
 Big Buck Hunter
 Deer Act 1980 (in the UK)
 Deer farm
 Deer horn
 Deer day
 Deer Hunter - video game
 Deer Avenger - video game
 Deerskin trade
 TheHunter - video game
 Hole in the Horn Buck
 James Jordan Buck
 Reindeer hunting in Greenland
 Venison

References

External links

 
Hunting deer